Al-Sultan Salis Kalaminjaa Siri Meesuvara Mahaa Radun (Dhivehi: އައްސުލްޠާން ސަލިސް ކަލަމިންޖާ ސިރީ މީސުވަރަ މަހާރަދުން), also known as as-Sulṭān Ṣalāḥ ad-Dīn Ṣāliḥ al-Bangālī was the Sultan of Maldives from 1293 to 1302. He succeeded to the throne after the death of his father Sultan Yoosuf I, by becoming the 15th sultan to ascend the throne of Maldives from the Lunar dynasty. However, according to Moroccan traveller Ibn Battuta, he was not the son of Yoosuf, but rather was a Bengali who had founded a new dynasty.

References

1302 deaths
14th-century sultans of the Maldives
13th-century sultans of the Maldives
Year of birth unknown